Paul Anthony Samuelson (May 15, 1915 – December 13, 2009) was an American economist who was the first American to win the Nobel Memorial Prize in Economic Sciences. When awarding the prize in 1970, the Swedish Royal Academies stated that he "has done more than any other contemporary economist to raise the level of scientific analysis in economic theory". Economic historian Randall E. Parker has called him the "Father of Modern Economics", and The New York Times considers him to be the "foremost academic economist of the 20th century".

Samuelson was likely the most influential economist of the latter half of the 20th century. In 1996, when he was awarded the National Medal of Science, considered to be America's top science-honor, President Bill Clinton commended Samuelson for his "fundamental contributions to economic science" for over 60 years. Samuelson considered mathematics to be the "natural language" for economists and contributed significantly to the mathematical foundations of economics with his book Foundations of Economic Analysis. He was author of the best-selling economics textbook of all time: Economics: An Introductory Analysis, first published in 1948. It was the second American textbook that attempted to explain the principles of Keynesian economics. It is now in its 19th edition, having sold nearly 4 million copies in 40 languages. James Poterba, former head of MIT's Department of Economics, noted that by his book, Samuelson "leaves an immense legacy, as a researcher and a teacher, as one of the giants on whose shoulders every contemporary economist stands".

He entered the University of Chicago at age 16, during the depths of the Great Depression, and received his PhD in economics from Harvard. After graduating, he became an assistant professor of economics at Massachusetts Institute of Technology (MIT) when he was 25 years of age and a full professor at age 32. In 1966, he was named Institute Professor, MIT's highest faculty honor. He spent his career at MIT, where he was instrumental in turning its Department of Economics into a world-renowned institution by attracting other noted economists to join the faculty, including later winners of the Nobel Prize Robert Solow, Franco Modigliani, Robert C. Merton, Joseph Stiglitz, and Paul Krugman.

He served as an advisor to President John F. Kennedy and President Lyndon B. Johnson, and was a consultant to the United States Treasury, the Bureau of the Budget and the President's Council of Economic Advisers. Samuelson wrote a weekly column for Newsweek magazine along with Chicago School economist Milton Friedman, where they represented opposing sides: Samuelson, as a self described "Cafeteria Keynesian", claimed taking the Keynesian perspective but only accepting what he felt was good in it. By contrast, Friedman represented the monetarist perspective. Together with Henry Wallich, their 1967 columns earned the magazine a Gerald Loeb Special Award in 1968.

Samuelson worked in many theoretical fields, including: consumer theory; welfare economics; capital; finance, particularly the efficient-market hypothesis; public finance, particularly optimal allocation; international economics, particularly the Balassa–Samuelson effect and the Heckscher–Ohlin model; macroeconomics, particularly the overlapping generations model; and market economics.

Biography

Samuelson was born in Gary, Indiana, on May 15, 1915, to Frank Samuelson, a pharmacist, and Ella née Lipton. His family, he later said, was "made up of upwardly mobile Jewish immigrants from Poland who had prospered considerably in World War I, because Gary was a brand new steel-town when my family went there". In 1923, Samuelson moved to Chicago where he graduated from Hyde Park High School (now Hyde Park Career Academy). He then studied at the University of Chicago and received his Bachelor of Arts degree there in 1935. He said he was born as an economist, at 8.00am on January 2, 1932, in the University of Chicago classroom. The lecture mentioned as the cause was on the British economist Thomas Malthus, who most famously studied population growth and its effects. Samuelson felt there was a dissonance between neoclassical economics and the way the system seemed to behave; he said Henry Simons and Frank Knight were a big influence on him. He next completed his Master of Arts degree in 1936, and his Doctor of Philosophy in 1941 at Harvard University. He won the David A. Wells prize in 1941 for writing the best doctoral dissertation at Harvard University in economics, for a thesis titled "Foundations of Analytical Economics", which later turned into Foundations of Economic Analysis. As a graduate student at Harvard, Samuelson studied economics under Joseph Schumpeter, Wassily Leontief, Gottfried Haberler, and the "American Keynes" Alvin Hansen. Samuelson moved to MIT as an assistant professor in 1940 and remained there until his death.

Samuelson's family included many well-known economists, including brother Robert Summers, sister-in-law Anita Summers, brother-in-law Kenneth Arrow and nephew Larry Summers.

During his seven decades as an economist, Samuelson's professional positions included:
 Assistant professor of economics at MIT, 1940; associate professor, 1944.
 Member of the Radiation Laboratory 1944–45.
 Professor of international economic relations (part-time) at the Fletcher School of Law and Diplomacy in 1945.
 Guggenheim Fellowship from 1948 to 1949
 Professor of economics at MIT beginning in 1947 and Institute Professor beginning in 1962.
 Vernon F. Taylor Visiting Distinguished Professor at Trinity University (Texas) in spring 1989.

Death
Samuelson died after a brief illness on December 13, 2009, at the age of 94. His death was announced by the Massachusetts Institute of Technology. James M. Poterba, an economics professor at MIT and the president of the National Bureau of Economic Research, commented that Samuelson "leaves an immense legacy, as a researcher and a teacher, as one of the giants on whose shoulders every contemporary economist stands". Susan Hockfield, the president of MIT, said that Samuelson "transformed everything he touched: the theoretical foundations of his field, the way economics was taught around the world, the ethos and stature of his department, the investment practices of MIT, and the lives of his colleagues and students".

Fields of interest
As professor of economics at the Massachusetts Institute of Technology, Samuelson worked in many fields, including:
 Consumer theory, where he pioneered the revealed preference approach, which is a method by which one can discern a consumer's utility function, by observing their behavior. Rather than postulate a utility function or a preference ordering, Samuelson imposed conditions directly on the choices made by individuals – their preferences as revealed by their choices.
 Welfare economics, in which he popularised the Lindahl–Bowen–Samuelson conditions (criteria for deciding whether an action will improve welfare) and demonstrated in 1950 the insufficiency of a national-income index to reveal which of two social options was uniformly outside the other's (feasible) possibility function (Collected Scientific Papers, v. 2, ch. 77; Fischer, 1987, p. 236).
 Capital theory, where he is known for 1958 consumption loans model and a variety of turnpike theorems and involved in Cambridge capital controversy.
 Finance theory, in which he is known for the efficient-market hypothesis.
 Public finance theory, in which he is particularly known for his work on determining the optimal allocation of resources in the presence of both public goods and private goods.
 International economics, where he influenced the development of two important international trade models: the Balassa–Samuelson effect, and the Heckscher–Ohlin model (with the Stolper–Samuelson theorem).
 Macroeconomics, where he popularized the overlapping generations model as a way to analyze economic agents' behavior across multiple periods of time (Collected Scientific Papers, v. 1, ch. 21) and contributed to formation of the neoclassical synthesis.
 Market economics: Samuelson believed unregulated markets have drawbacks, he stated, "free markets do not stabilise themselves. Zero regulating is vastly suboptimal to rational regulating. Libertarianism is its own worst enemy!" Samuelson strongly criticised Friedman and Friedrich Hayek, arguing their opposition to state intervention "tells us something about them rather than something about Genghis Khan or Franklin Roosevelt. It is paranoid to warn against inevitable slippery slopes ... once individual commercial freedoms are in any way infringed upon."

Impact
Samuelson is considered one of the founders of neo-Keynesian economics and a seminal figure in the development of neoclassical economics. In awarding him the Nobel Memorial Prize in Economic Sciences, the committee stated:

He was also essential in creating the neoclassical synthesis, which ostensibly incorporated Keynesian and neoclassical principles and still dominates current mainstream economics. In 2003, Samuelson was one of the ten Nobel Prize–winning economists signing the Economists' statement opposing the Bush tax cuts.

Aphorisms and quotations
Stanislaw Ulam once challenged Samuelson to name one theory in all of the social sciences that is both true and nontrivial. Several years later, Samuelson responded with David Ricardo's theory of comparative advantage: "That it is logically true need not be argued before a mathematician; that is not trivial is attested by the thousands of important and intelligent men who have never been able to grasp the doctrine for themselves or to believe it after it was explained to them."

For many years, Samuelson wrote a column for Newsweek. One article included Samuelson's most quoted remark and a favorite economics joke:

To prove that Wall Street is an early omen of movements still to come in GNP, commentators quote economic studies alleging that market downturns predicted four out of the last five recessions. That is an understatement. Wall Street indexes predicted nine out of the last five recessions! And its mistakes were beauties.

In the early editions of his famous, bestselling economics textbook Paul Samuelson joked that GDP falls when a man "marries his maid".

Publications

Foundations of Economic Analysis

Paul Samuelson's book Foundations of Economic Analysis (1946) is considered his magnum opus. It is derived from his doctoral dissertation, and was inspired by the classical thermodynamic methods. The book proposes to:
 examine underlying analogies between central features in theoretical and applied economics and
 study how operationally meaningful theorems can be derived with a small number of analogous methods (p. 3),
in order to derive "a general theory of economic theories" (Samuelson, 1983, p. xxvi). The book showed how these goals could be parsimoniously and fruitfully achieved, using the language of the mathematics applied to diverse subfields of economics. The book proposes two general hypotheses as sufficient for its purposes:
 maximizing behavior of agents (including consumers as to utility and business firms as to profit) and
 economic systems (including a market and an economy) in stable equilibrium.
In the first tenet, his views presented the idea that all actors, whether firms or consumers, are striving to maximize something. They could be attempting to maximize profits, utility, or wealth, but it did not matter because their efforts to improve their well-being would provide a basic model for all actors in an economic system. His second tenet was focused on providing insight on the workings of equilibrium in an economy. Generally in a market, supply would equal demand. However, he urged that this might not be the case and that the important thing to look at was a system's natural resting point. Foundations presents the question of how an equilibrium would react when it is moved from its optimal point. Samuelson was also influential in providing explanations on how the changes in certain factors can affect an economic system. For example, he could explain the economic effect of changes in taxes or new technologies.

In the course of analysis, comparative statics, (the analysis of changes in equilibrium of the system that result from a parameter change of the system) is formalized and clearly stated.

The chapter on welfare economics "attempt(s) to give a brief but fairly complete survey of the whole field of welfare economics" (Samuelson, 1947, p. 252). It also exposits on and develops what became commonly called the Bergson–Samuelson social welfare function. It shows how to represent (in the maximization calculus) all real-valued economic measures of any belief system that is required to rank consistently different feasible social configurations in an ethical sense as "better than", "worse than", or "indifferent to" each other (p. 221).

Economics

Samuelson is also author (and since 1985 co-author) of an influential principles textbook, Economics, first published in 1948 (19th ed. as of 2010; multiple reprints). The book sold more than 300,000 copies of each edition from 1961 through 1976 and was translated in the forty-one languages. As of 2018, it has sold over four million copies. William Nordhaus joined as co-author on the 12th edition (1985). Sometime before 1988, it had become the best-selling economics textbook of all time.

Samuelson was once quoted as saying, "Let those who will write the nation's laws if I can write its textbooks." Written in the shadow of the Great Depression and the Second World War, it helped to popularize the insights of John Maynard Keynes. A main focus was how to avoid, or at least mitigate, the recurring slumps in economic activity.

Samuelson wrote: "It is not too much to say that the widespread creation of dictatorships and the resulting World War II stemmed in no small measure from the world's failure to meet this basic economic problem [the Great Depression] adequately." This reflected the concern of Keynes himself with the economic causes of war and the importance of economic policy in promoting peace.

Samuelson's book was the second to introduce Keynesian economics to a wide audience, and was by far the most successful. Canadian economist Lorie Tarshis, who had been a student attending Keynes's lectures at Harvard in the 1930s, published in 1947 an introductory textbook that incorporated his lecture notes, titled Elements of Economics.

Other publications
There are 388 papers in Samuelson's Collected Scientific Papers. Stanley Fischer (1987, p. 234) writes that taken together they are "unique in their verve, breadth of economic and general knowledge, mastery of setting, and generosity of allusions to predecessors".

Samuelson was co-editor, along with William A. Barnett, of Inside the Economist's Mind: Conversations with Eminent Economists (Blackwell Publishing, 2007), a collection of interviews with notable economists of the 20th century.

Criticisms

Textbook influences in higher education 
Samuelson's textbook was a watershed in introducing a serious study of business cycles in the economics curriculum. It was particularly timely because it followed the Great Depression, which had only ended because of the fiscal stimulus of World War II. The study of business cycles along with the introduction of the Keynesian approach of aggregate demand set the stage for the macroeconomic revolution in America, which then diffused throughout the world through translations into every major language. Generations of students, who then became teachers, learned their first and most influential lessons from Samuelson's Economics. It attracted many imitators, who became successful in different niches of the college market.

The text was not without criticism. While it praised the "mixed economy" of market and government, some found that too radical and attacked it as socialist. As a precursor to criticisms of Samuelson's Economics textbook, Lorie Tarshis's textbook was attacked by trustees of, and donors to, American colleges and universities as preaching a "socialist heresy". Piling on, William F. Buckley, Jr., in his 1951 book, God and Man at Yale, devoted an entire chapter, attacking both Samuelson's and Tarshis' textbooks. For Samuelson's book, Buckley drew from the Educational Examiner and credited it as an "excellent review of Samuelson's text." ("Note to Chapter Two." p. 234) For Tarshis' book, Buckley drew from Merwin K. Hart's organization : "I am also grateful to the National Economic Council for its telling analysis of the Tarshis." ("Note to Chapter Two." p. 234) Buckley essentially characterized both as – in the words of Paul Davidson – "communist inspired". Buckley, for the rest of his life, defended the criticisms set forth in his book.

Economic growth of USSR 
One criticism – of a concept that Samuelson added to his Economics textbook – was the comparison of USA growth rates with those of the USSR, which, according to the criticism, was inconsistent with historical GNP differences. The textbook's 1967 edition (7th ed.) extrapolates (projects) the possibility of USSR/US real GNP parity between 1977 and 1995. Each subsequent edition extrapolates a date range further in the future until those graphs were dropped from the 1985 edition (12th ed.).

Phillips Curve
Samuelson, together with Robert Solow, helped develop and popularize the mathematics of the Phillips Curve.  The curve suggested that unemployment and inflation were inversely related; with the advent of stagflation in the 1970s some economists including Milton Friedman and Friedrich Hayek attacked the economics based on the Phillips Curve as questionable or mistaken.

Memberships
 Member of the American Academy of Arts and Sciences, the American Philosophical Society, the United States National Academy of Sciences, fellow of Royal Society of London
 Fellow of the American Philosophical Society and the British Academy;
 President (1965–68) of the International Economic Association
 Member and past president (1961) of the American Economic Association
 Member of the editorial board and past-president (1951) of the Econometric Society
Fellow, council member and past vice-president of the Royal Economic Society.
Member of Phi Beta Kappa.

List of publications
 Samuelson, Paul A. (1947), Enlarged ed. 1983. Foundations of Economic Analysis, Harvard University Press.
 Samuelson, Paul A. (1948), Economics: An Introductory Analysis, ; with William D. Nordhaus (since 1985), 2009, 19th ed., McGraw–Hill. 
 Samuelson, Paul A. (1952), "Economic Theory and Mathematics – An Appraisal", American Economic Review, 42(2), pp. 56–66.
 
 Samuelson, Paul A. (1958), Linear Programming and Economic Analysis with Robert Dorfman and Robert M. Solow, McGraw–Hill. Chapter-preview links.
 
 
 The Collected Scientific Papers of Paul A. Samuelson, MIT Press. Preview links for vol. 1–3 below. Contents links for vol. 4–7. .
Samuelson, Paul A. (1966), Vol. 1 → via Google Books, 1937–mid-1964.
Samuelson, Paul A. (1966), Vol. 2 → via Google Books, 1937–mid-1964.
Samuelson, Paul A. (1972), Vol. 3 → via Google Books, mid-1964–1970.
Samuelson, Paul A. (1977), Vol. 4 → via Internet Archive , 1971–76.
Samuelson, Paul A. (1986), Vol. 5 → via Google Books, 1977–1985 Description → via 
Samuelson, Paul A. (2011), Vol. 6, 1986–2009. Description → via Wayback Machine
Samuelson, Paul A. (2011), Vol. 7, 1986–2009.
 Paul A. Samuelson Papers, 1933–2010, Rubenstein Library, Duke University. .
 Samuelson, Paul A.  (1983).  "My Life Philosophy," The American Economist, 27(2), pp. 5-12.
 Samuelson, Paul A. (2007), Inside the Economist's Mind: Conversations with Eminent Economists with William A. Barnett, Blackwell Publishing, 
 Samuelson, Paul A. (2002), Paul Samuelson and the Foundations of Modern Economics, Transaction Publishers, 
Samuelson, Paul A. (2004), Macroeconomics
Samuelson, Paul A. (2004), Microeconomics

See also

Samuelson's inequality
Samuelson's Iceberg transport cost model
Keynesian economics
New Keynesian economics
Neo-Keynesian economics
Neoclassical economics
Paul Samuelson - Wikiquote

Notes

Explanatory annotations

References

Further reading
 Description & arrow-scrollable preview.
 
 .
 .
 .
 .

External links

 
 
 Presentation Speech by Professor Assar Lindbeck, Stockholm School of Economics, Award Ceremony, The Bank of Sweden Prize in Economic Sciences in Memory of Alfred Nobel, 1970
 A History of Economic Thought biography, 2004
 
 Paul Samuelson, Yale Honorands biography, May 2005
 "Nobel-winning economist Paul A. Samuelson dies at age 94", MIT News, December 13, 2009
 
 

1915 births
2009 deaths
Nobel laureates in Economics
American Nobel laureates
20th-century American writers
21st-century American non-fiction writers
20th-century American economists
21st-century American economists
American people of Polish-Jewish descent
Fellows of the Econometric Society
Harvard University alumni
Jewish American writers
Jewish American social scientists
Kennedy administration personnel
MIT School of Humanities, Arts, and Social Sciences faculty
Members of the United States National Academy of Sciences
National Medal of Science laureates
Writers from Gary, Indiana
Trade economists
University of Chicago alumni
Neo-Keynesian economists
Presidents of the Econometric Society
People from Belmont, Massachusetts
Presidents of the American Economic Association
Economists from Massachusetts
Economists from Indiana
Corresponding Fellows of the British Academy
Hyde Park Academy High School alumni
Burials at Mount Auburn Cemetery
Members of the American Philosophical Society